Cydni Tetro is an American CEO, speaker, and serial entrepreneur.

Tetro obtained a Bachelor of Science in computer science and a Master of Business Administration from Brigham Young University.

Career
Tetro was the founder of digital experience company ForgeDX. Tetro was the founder and CEO of 3DplusMe, a 3D printing software platform, that was acquired by WhiteClouds.

Tetro spent four years as an Entrepreneur in residence at The Walt Disney Company building technology businesses from research and development projects and launching those products into theme parks and ESPN properties.

She created a non-profit, the Women Tech Council, to amplify the economic impact of women in technology with more than 10,000 members in its community. As president of the Women Tech Council, she led the launch of the Women Tech Talent Pipeline Alliance along with the Utah's Office of Economic Development, Code in Color, Latinas in Tech Utah, United Way, Utah's Department of Workforce Services and Tech Moms. Tetro was named to the Zenovate board of directors in 2021. She is also faculty for the Goldman Sachs 10,000 Small Businesses initiative.

Personal life
Tetro grew up in Lindon, Utah as the oldest of eight children. She is married with three children and is a member of the Church of Jesus Christ of Latter-day Saints.

References

External links
 Women Tech Council Official website
 Marriott School Entrepreneurship Founders Board Official profile

Living people
Brigham Young University alumni
Latter Day Saints from Utah
American women chief executives
American technology executives
Year of birth missing (living people)